The 2020–21 K.A.S. Eupen season was the club's 76th season in existence and its 5th consecutive season in the top flight of Belgian football. In addition to the domestic league, Eupen participated in this season's edition of the Belgian Cup. The season covered the period from 1 July 2020 to 30 June 2021.

Players

First-team squad

Transfers

In

Out

Pre-season and friendlies

Competitions

Overview

Belgian First Division A

League table

Results summary

Results by round

Matches
The league fixtures were announced on 8 July 2020.

Belgian Cup

Statistics

Goalscorers

References

External links

K.A.S. Eupen
Eupen